Major John White was a native Irish soldier in the American Revolutionary War. He died from a gunshot wound shortly after October 4, 1777, while acting as a volunteer aide under General John Sullivan during the Battle of Germantown. He was shot during the attempted burning of Chew House, also known as Cliveden.

White was a merchant prior to the war. In 1765 or 1766, he married Sarah Moore, daughter of Alexander Moore. Before her death on October 15, 1770, they had three children: Alexander, William, and John Moore White. He left his family and business in England in order to participate in the war.

References 

1777 deaths
United States military personnel killed in the American Revolutionary War